Ion Lewis (1858-1933) was a founding member of a Portland architectural firm Whidden & Lewis that was formed around the beginning of the 20th century. The firm was formed with partner William M. Whidden. Their residential buildings were mostly in the Colonial Revival style, while their commercial buildings were primarily in the twentieth-century classical style.  The commercial buildings often featured brick, along with terra cotta ornamentation. Many of their buildings are listed on the National Register of Historic Places (NRHP). 

Lewis was born March 26, 1858, in Lynn, Massachusetts. He attended the Massachusetts Institute of Technology, after which he worked for Peabody & Stearns. In 1882 he formed a partnership with Henry Paston Clark, but moved west soon afterward. He worked in Chicago before going to Portland in 1889, where he formed a partnership with Whidden, a former MIT classmate. Although Whidden died in 1929, Lewis continued the firm of Whidden & Lewis until his own death.

Some buildings he designed include Portland City Hall, the Multnomah County Courthouse, and the Forestry Building from the Lewis and Clark Centennial Exposition. Lewis died on August 29, 1933.

Further reading
Marlitt, Richard. Matters of Proportion: The Portland Residential Architecture of Whidden & Lewis. Portland: Oregon Historical Society Press, 1989.

References

Architects from Lynn, Massachusetts
Architects from Portland, Oregon
1853 births
1933 deaths
Fellows of the American Institute of Architects